The Rice County Courthouse, located at 218 3rd Street NW in Faribault, Rice County, in the U.S. state of Minnesota, is an Art Deco building constructed of natural-face Faribault stone horizontally banded at intervals with sawed-faced stone. Nairne W. Fisher of St. Cloud was the architect for the courthouse, and is also credited with designing the Pope County Courthouse. The main rotunda has metal fixtures and Art Deco glass. Polished black and gray Tennessee marble is used extensively in the walls, floors, and stairs, with a terrazzo map of Rice County centered on the floor. The  courtroom on the third floor was finished with fine-grained walnut walls with matching custom-built furnishings. The building was built in 1934 at a cost of $200,000.

A guidebook to Minnesota architecture described the courthouse building as "A near-perfect mixture of the classical and the Zigzag Moderne. Relief sculpture on the sides of the building along 4th and 3rd Streets extols civic virtue, industry and farming. Within, a central rotunda is approached by a Zigzag Moderne staircase; Moderne metal and glass light fixtures abound."

The brick jail building, located at 128 3rd Street NW in Faribault, was constructed in 1910 in the Richardsonian Romanesque style, and was designed by Albert Schippel of Mankato, Minnesota.

References

Art Deco architecture in Minnesota
Art Deco courthouses
Buildings and structures in Faribault, Minnesota
County courthouses in Minnesota
County government buildings in Minnesota
Courthouses on the National Register of Historic Places in Minnesota
Defunct prisons in Minnesota
Government buildings completed in 1910
Government buildings completed in 1934
Jails on the National Register of Historic Places in Minnesota
Romanesque Revival architecture in Minnesota
National Register of Historic Places in Rice County, Minnesota
Jails in Minnesota
1910 establishments in Minnesota